Cratostigma is a genus of ascidian tunicates in the family Pyuridae.

Species within the genus Cratostigma include:
 Cratostigma campoyi Ramos, Turon & Lafargue, 1988 
 Cratostigma gravellophila (Pérès, 1955) 
 Cratostigma intermedia Vazquez & Ramos-Espla, 1993 
 Cratostigma regularis Monniot C., 1963 
 Cratostigma simplex Millar, 1982 
 Cratostigma singularis (Van Name, 1912) 
 Cratostigma vestigialis Turon, 1988

References

Stolidobranchia
Tunicate genera